Ocean Sea is a 1993 novel by the Italian writer Alessandro Baricco. Its narrative revolves around the lives of a group of people gathered at a remote seaside hotel. The novel won the Viareggio Prize.

Reception
Richard Bernstein reviewed the book for The New York Times, and wrote: "Ocean Sea unfolds in its poetically elliptical way. Mr. Baricco is a literary cubist, a stylist who looks simultaneously at the several sides of things. He switches from one rhetorical mode to another, from a kind of symbolist poetry to grand adventure narrative to picaresque comedy." Bernstein continued: "This style of writing can be precious, artificial, a kind of verbal craftsmanship for craftsmanship's sake, but generally I read Ocean Sea transfixed by Mr. Baricco's linguistic originality, the boisterousness of his characters, and the skill with which he weaves the threads of a seemingly disjointed plot into a single narrative strand." Tom Boncza-Tomaszewski of The Independent called the book an "extraordinary novel", and wrote: "A book about being, metaphysics juggled like the best trick of a wise old clown, this is a novel that at least suggests there's more to life than what any rationalist would tell you."

See also
 1993 in literature
 Italian literature

References

1993 novels
20th-century Italian novels
Works by Alessandro Baricco
Novels set in hotels